The microcosm–macrocosm analogy (or, equivalently, macrocosm–microcosm analogy) refers to a historical view which posited a structural similarity between the human being (the microcosm, i.e., the small order or the small universe) and the cosmos as a whole (the macrocosm, i.e., the great order or the great universe). Given this fundamental analogy, truths about the nature of the cosmos as a whole may be inferred from truths about human nature, and vice versa.

One important corollary of this view is that the cosmos as a whole may be considered to be alive, and thus to have a mind or soul (the world soul), a position advanced by Plato in his Timaeus. Moreover, this cosmic mind or soul was often thought to be divine, most notably by the Stoics and those who were influenced by them, such as the authors of the Hermetica. Hence, it was sometimes inferred that the human mind or soul was divine in nature as well.

Apart from this important psychological and noetic (i.e., related to the mind) application, the analogy was also applied to human physiology. For example, the cosmological functions of the seven classical planets were sometimes taken to be analogous to the physiological functions of human organs, such as the heart, the spleen, the liver, the stomach, etc.

The view itself is ancient, and may be found in many philosophical systems world-wide, such as for example in ancient Mesopotamia, in ancient Iran, or in ancient Chinese philosophy. However, the terms microcosm and macrocosm refer more specifically to the analogy as it was developed in ancient Greek philosophy and its medieval and early modern descendants.

In contemporary usage, the terms microcosm and macrocosm are also employed to refer to any smaller system that is representative of a larger one, and vice versa.

History

Antiquity 
Among ancient Greek and Hellenistic philosophers, notable proponents of the microcosm–macrocosm analogy included Anaximander, Plato, the Hippocratic authors (late 5th or early 4th century BCE and onwards), and the Stoics (3rd century BCE and onwards). In later periods, the analogy was especially prominent in the works of those philosophers who were heavily influenced by Platonic and Stoic thought, such as Philo of Alexandria, the authors of the early Greek Hermetica, and the Neoplatonists (3rd century CE and onwards). The analogy was also employed in late antique and early medieval religious literature, such as in the Bundahishn, a Zoroastrian encyclopedic work, and the Avot de-Rabbi Nathan, a Jewish Rabbinical text.

Middle Ages 
Medieval philosophy was generally dominated by Aristotle, who despite having been the first to coin the term "microcosm", had posited a fundamental and insurmountable difference between the region below the moon (the sublunary world, consisting of the four elements) and the region above the moon (the superlunary world, consisting of a fifth element). The analogy was elaborated by alchemists such as those writing under the name of Jabir ibn Hayyan, by the anonymous Shi'ite philosophers known as the Ikhwān al-Ṣafāʾ ("The Brethren of Purity"), by Jewish theologians and philosophers such as Isaac Israeli, Saadia Gaon (882/892–942), Ibn Gabirol (11th century), and Judah Halevi, by Victorine monks such as Godfrey of Saint Victor (born 1125, author of a treatise called Microcosmus), by the Andalusian mystic Ibn Arabi (1165–1240), by the German cardinal Nicholas of Cusa (1401–1464), and by numerous others.

Renaissance
The revival of Hermeticism and Neoplatonism in the Renaissance, both of which had reserved a prominent place for the microcosm–macrocosm analogy, also led to a marked rise in popularity of the latter. Some of the most notable proponents of the concept in this period include Marsilio Ficino (1433 – 1499), Heinrich Cornelius Agrippa (1486–1535), Francesco Patrizi (1529–1597), Giordano Bruno (1548–1600), and Tommaso Campanella (1568–1639). It was also central to the new medical theories propounded by the Swiss physician Paracelsus (1494–1541) and his many followers, most notably Robert Fludd (1574–1637). Andreas Vesalius (1514–1564) in his anatomy text De fabrica wrote that the human body "in many respects corresponds admirably to the universe and for that reason was called the little universe by the ancients."

In Judaism

Analogies between microcosm and macrocosm are found throughout the history of Jewish philosophy. According to this analogy, there is a structural similarity between the human being (the microcosm, from ancient Greek μικρός κόσμος, mikrós kósmos; Hebrew עולם קטן, Olam katan, i.e., the small universe) and the cosmos as a whole (the macrocosm, from ancient Greek μακρός κόσμος, makrós kósmos, i.e., the great universe).

The view was elaborated by the Jewish philosopher Philo of Alexandria (c. 20 BCE–50 CE), who adopted it from ancient Greek and Hellenistic philosophy. Similar ideas can also be found in early Rabbinical literature. In the Middle Ages, the analogy became a prominent theme in the works of most Jewish philosophers.

Rabbinical literature

In the Avot de-Rabbi Nathan (compiled c. 700–900 CE), human parts are compared with parts belonging to the larger world: the hair is like a forest, the lungs like the wind, the loins like counselors, the stomach like a mill, etc.

Middle Ages

The microcosm–macrocosm analogy was a common theme among medieval Jewish philosophers, just as it was among the Arabic philosophers who were their peers. Especially influential with regard to the microcosm–macrocosm analogy were the Epistles of the Brethren of Purity, an encyclopedic work written in the 10th century by an anonymous group of Shi'ite philosophers. Having been brought to Islamic Spain at an early date by the hadith scholar and alchemist Maslama al-Qurṭubī (died 964), the Epistles were of central importance to Spanish Jewish philosophers such as Bahya ibn Paquda (c. 1050–1120), Judah Halevi (c. 1075–1141), Joseph ibn Tzaddik (died 1149), and Abraham ibn Ezra (c. 1090–1165).

Nevertheless, the analogy was already in use by earlier Jewish philosophers. In his commentary on the Sefer Yetzirah ("Book of Creation"), Saadia Gaon (882/892–942) put forward a set of analogies between the cosmos, the Tabernacle, and the human being. Saadia was followed in this by a number of later authors, such as Bahya ibn Paquda, Judah Halevi, and Abraham ibn Ezra.

Whereas the physiological application of the analogy in the Rabbinical work Avot de-Rabbi Nathan had still been relatively simple and crude, much more elaborate versions of this application were given by Bahya ibn Paquda and Joseph ibn Tzaddik (in his Sefer ha-Olam ha-Katan, "Book of the Microcosm"), both of whom compared human parts with the heavenly bodies and other parts of the cosmos at large.

The analogy was linked to the ancient theme of "know thyself" (Greek: γνῶθι σεαυτόν, gnōthi seauton) by the physician and philosopher Isaac Israeli (c. 832–932), who suggested that by knowing oneself, a human being may gain knowledge of all things. This theme of self-knowledge returned in the works of Joseph ibn Tzaddik, who added that in this way humans may come to know God himself. The macrocosm was also associated with the divine by Judah Halevi, who saw God as the spirit, soul, mind, and life that animates the universe, while according to Maimonides (1138–1204), the relationship between God and the universe is analogous to the relationship between the intellect and the human being.

See also

Notes

References

Bibliography

General overviews

The following works contain general overviews of the microcosm–macrocosm analogy:

Other sources cited
 
 
 
 
 
 
 
 
 
 
 
 
 
 
 
 
 
 
 
 
 

Natural philosophy
Metaphysics of religion
Esoteric cosmology
Hermeticism
Stoicism
Paracelsus
Philosophical analogies
Jewish philosophy